Paciano Basilio Aniceto,  (born March 9, 1937) is a Filipino Roman Catholic Archbishop Emeritus of the Archdiocese of San Fernando. He was the third prelate to head the Archdiocese, which is located in San Fernando City, Pampanga, Philippines.

Biography 
Aniceto was born on March 9, 1937, in the old town of Santa Ana, Pampanga. He was ordained a priest on December 23, 1962. He served various parishes under the Diocese of San Fernando (elevated to an Archdiocese on March 17, 1975, by Pope Paul VI.) He was appointed Auxiliary bishop of Tuguegarao City and Titular bishop of Tlos on April 7, 1979. He was consecrated as a Bishop on May 27, 1979. His principal consecrator was Pope John Paul II and his principal co-consecrators were Duraisamy Simon Cardinal Lourdusamy and Eduardo Cardinal Martinez Somalo.

On October 20, 1983, he was appointed Bishop of the Diocese of Iba, Zambales and served as Bishop for 5 years. Then on January 31, 1989, he was elevated to the Metropolitan See of the Archdiocese of San Fernando as Archbishop, succeeding Archbishop Oscar Cruz.

On July 25, 2014, Pope Francis named Iba Bishop Florentino Lavarias as Archbishop of San Fernando, Pampanga, succeeding Aniceto, who resigned on reaching the age limit.

References

1937 births
20th-century Roman Catholic archbishops in the Philippines
21st-century Roman Catholic archbishops in the Philippines
Kapampangan people
Living people
People from Pampanga
Roman Catholic archbishops of San Fernando